Odites flavimaculata is a moth in the family Depressariidae. It was described by Hugo Theodor Christoph in 1882. It is found in south-eastern Siberia in Russia.

References

Moths described in 1882
Odites